The coat of arms of North Rhine-Westphalia is the official coat of arms of the German state of North Rhine-Westphalia.

Overview

After World War II on August 23, 1946 the British military administration in Germany established the new state of North Rhine-Westphalia with the merger of the provinces of Westphalia and North Rhine, the northern part of the Prussian Rhine Province, to which in January 1947 the Free State of Lippe was added. That same year Wolfgang Pagenstecher, a famous German heraldist living in Düsseldorf, made the original blazon for the newly created state, which adopted it on 5 February 1948. On 10 March 1953 this has been confirmed by the Law about the state's colours, the state's coat of arms and the state' s flag.

The named law starts as follows:

So the constituent three parts of this coat of arms are:
dexter: Vert a bend sinister wavy Argent, which is a reflection of the former coat of arms of Rhine Province. This until then showed a bend wavy, representing the river Rhine flowing through the Rhineland, today's southwestern part of the state. The change from bend to bend sinister has only been done because of aesthetic reasons.
sinister: Gules a horse rampant Argent, as opposed to the jumping horse in the arms of Lower Saxony, representing Westphalia, the northeastern part of the state. Originally it was the Saxon steed, the emblem of the Saxon stern duchy. It is identical to the preceding coat of arms of the Province of Westphalia.
enté en point embowed: Argent a rose Gules seeded and leaved Or, showing the rose of Lippe. This was the coat of arms of the Principality of Lippe, now the district of Lippe in the east of the state.

The coat of arms appears as a charge on the state flag of North Rhine-Westphalia.

History

References

See also
List of coats of arms of the districts in North Rhine-Westphalia
Coat of arms of Prussia
Coat of arms of Germany
Origin of the coats of arms of German federal states.

North Rhine-Westphalia
North Rhine-Westphalia
Culture of North Rhine-Westphalia
North Rhine-Westphalia
North Rhine-Westphalia
North Rhine-Westphalia